Tropical Storm Keith was the eleventh Atlantic tropical cyclone of the 1988 Atlantic hurricane season. It struck the Continental United States later in the calendar year than any since the 1925 Atlantic hurricane season. Keith developed out of a tropical wave in the Caribbean Sea on November 17. It tracked northwestward, and under generally favorable conditions, it reached a peak intensity of  shortly before striking the northeastern tip of the Yucatán Peninsula. It turned northeastward in the Gulf of Mexico, and made landfall near Sarasota, Florida, on November 23. Keith accelerated its forward motion under the influence of a cold front, and became extratropical near Bermuda on November 24. The extratropical remnant persisted for two more days.

Early in its duration, Keith produced moderate to heavy rainfall in Honduras, Jamaica, and Cuba. Minimal damage was reported in Mexico, which was still recovering from the effects of Hurricane Gilbert two months prior. Keith, the last of four named tropical cyclones to hit the United States during the season, produced moderate rainfall, rough storm surge, and gusty winds across central Florida. Overall damage was fairly minor but widespread, totaling $7.3 million (1988 USD; $  USD). Near the coast of Florida, damage occurred mainly from storm surge and beach erosion. Further inland there were floods, downed trees and power lines. No fatalities were reported.

Meteorological history

A tropical wave moved off the coast of Africa on November 5. It tracked steadily west across the tropical Atlantic Ocean. Its forward motion slowed after it passed the Lesser Antilles on November 12. A large well-defined anticyclone persisted across much of the Caribbean Sea, providing a favorable environment for the system. A low-level circulation gradually became evident on satellite imagery within the disturbance.

Initially, the depression was disorganized as it continued west; on November 18 the center became exposed from the area of deep convection. However, the upper-level environment gradually became more favorable for further development, and deep convection, or thunderstorm activity, developed closer to the center. An eastward-moving upper-level trough in the Gulf of Mexico turned the depression northwest. The next day, the depression intensified into a tropical storm while a short distance north of Honduras, receiving the name Keith. The trough, which turned Keith northwestward, rapidly accelerated northeastward; as a result, the storm moved slowly northwest until making landfall on the northeast tip of the Yucatán Peninsula at 0800 UTC on November 21, at an intensity slightly below hurricane status.

After briefly moving over land, Keith turned north under the influence of a trailing frontal trough. The storm became disorganized while recurving northeast because of increased vertical wind shear and the presence of cool dry air from its north. Its landfall was the second latest on record for the Continental United States, only behind a hurricane in the 1925 season. Reaching the Atlantic Ocean eight hours after moving ashore, Keith began to gradually re-intensify, and under the influence of a very large upper-level low pressure area over Newfoundland, the storm accelerated northeast. The extratropical storm turned westward and was last observed on November 26 northeast of Newfoundland.

Preparations

On November 20, shortly before the tropical depression intensified into a tropical storm, the government of Honduras issued a tropical storm warning for the Swan Islands, along with a tropical storm watch for the northwestern Honduran coastline. The advisories were discontinued within 10 hours of Keith's passage through the region. The government of Belize briefly declared a tropical storm watch for the whole coastline of the country, but when it became clear that Keith posed little threat, the watch was canceled. About 16 hours before the storm made landfall on the Yucatán Peninsula, the government of Mexico issued a tropical storm watch for much of the coastline of Quintana Roo. Six hours later, a tropical storm warning replaced the watch, and it was extended west to Progreso, Yucatán; a hurricane watch was also posted. Cuban officials issued a bulletin on the night of November 20, advising that tropical storm conditions would spread over the west part of Cuba. A subsequent bulletin indicated the possibility for hurricane conditions, but as the storm continued further to the northwest, the threat diminished.

Two days before the storm struck Florida, emergency management workers began working to prepare for its onslaught. The next day, the water levels in five lakes in Hillsborough County were decreased as a precaution. Residents prepared sandbags to prevent flooding along coastal areas, while boat owners worked to secure their boats. Some tourists near the southwest Florida coast left for areas further inland, though many stayed despite the storm. Red Cross officials opened six emergency shelters. Additionally, police departments in Clearwater, Indian Shores, and Largo expanded their workforce to handle storm-related problems. The storm resulted in the closure of some private schools as well as the Hillsborough Community College. About 21 hours before Keith made its final landfall, the National Hurricane Center issued a tropical storm warning along the Florida west coast from Cape Sable to Cedar Key. The next day, a tropical storm warning was posted from Jupiter, Florida, north to Savannah, Georgia. A tropical storm warning was briefly issued for Bermuda, as well.

Impact

Reports from Cozumel indicated torrential rainfall and a large number of lightning strikes during the period of highest winds. Rainfall peaked at  just south of Cancún. Still recovering from the effects of Hurricane Gilbert two months prior, the Yucatán Peninsula received only minor damage as a result of Keith. The storm triggered flooding in western Cuba that severely damaged tobacco and vegetable crops. Officials forced 2,500 residents to evacuate their homes due to the flooding.

Off the coast of Florida, a freighter and its crew of ten were stranded after the storm flooded its engine room. The combination of storm surge and waves severely eroded beaches along Charlotte Harbor and Estero Bay. In Naples, strong waves destroyed the western end of the Naples Pier where several boats were washed ashore. Inland from the immediate coastline, damage was mostly limited to isolated fresh-water flooding, downed trees, and power outages; overall damage was widespread but fairly light, and six structures were destroyed across the state. Before moving ashore, Keith spawned two tornadoes, one of which damaged approximately 30 mobile homes in Clermont. In Lakeland, a washed out track derailed a 34-car train, which broke a natural gas line and forced 450 people to evacuate. In Lee County, damage totaled $1.5 million (1988 USD; $  USD), and in Pinellas County the storm caused about $5.8 million in damage (1988 USD; $  USD).

Only light damage occurred on the island.

See also

List of Bermuda hurricanes
 List of Florida hurricanes (1975–1999)
 Other storms of the same name

References

External links
 1988 Atlantic Hurricane Season Summary
 National Hurricane Center Preliminary Report for Tropical Storm Keith

Keith
1988 natural disasters in the United States
Keith (1988)
Keith (1988)
Keith (1988)
Keith (1988)
Keith (1988)
Keith (1988)
Keith (1988)
Keith (1988)
1988 in Florida
Keith